Igor Klejch (born 28 March 1964) is a retired footballer who played as a midfielder for clubs in Czechoslovakia and Greece.

Club career
Klejch began playing football in the Czechoslovakian first division, making 149 appearances before the league split in 1992, including 28 appearances for FC Nitra during the 1990–91 season. He would become the leading goal-scorer in the Slovak second division the following season. Klejch played for Baník Ostrava and Svit Zlín in the Gambrinus liga, scoring a total of 17 goals in 58 appearances over two league seasons.

In July 1995, Klejch joined Greek Superleague side Panachaiki F.C. for the three seasons and would appear in 94 league matches and score 25 goals for the club.

References

External links
ΞΕΝΟΙ ΠΑΙΚΤΕΣ ΚΑΙ ΠΡΟΠΟΝΗΤΕΣ ΤΗΣ ΠΑΝΑΧΑΪΚΗΣ
JFK-Fotbal

1964 births
Living people
Slovak footballers
Slovak expatriate footballers
FC Spartak Trnava players
FK Dukla Banská Bystrica players
FC Nitra players
Czech First League players
FC Baník Ostrava players
FC Fastav Zlín players
Panachaiki F.C. players
Athlitiki Enosi Larissa F.C. players
Super League Greece players
Expatriate footballers in Greece

Association football forwards
FK Senica players